is a Japanese wrestler. He competed in the men's Greco-Roman 78 kg at the 1968 Summer Olympics.

References

1942 births
Living people
Japanese male sport wrestlers
Olympic wrestlers of Japan
Wrestlers at the 1968 Summer Olympics
Sportspeople from Hokkaido
20th-century Japanese people